Chantella Perera (born 7 June 1986) is an Australian rules footballer who played for West Coast in the AFL Women's (AFLW).

AFLW career
 In June 2021, Perera was delisted by West Coast.

References

External links

 

Living people
1986 births
West Coast Eagles (AFLW) players
Australian rules footballers from Victoria (Australia)
Sportswomen from Victoria (Australia)